World Trade may refer to:

International trade
International finance
World Trade Organization
World Trade (band), a progressive rock band
World Trade Center (disambiguation)